Trusted Media Brands, Inc. (TMBI), formerly known as the Reader's Digest Association, Inc. (RDA), is an American multi-platform media and publishing company that is co-headquartered in New York City and White Plains, New York. The company was founded by husband and wife DeWitt Wallace and Lila Bell Wallace in New York City in 1922 with the first publication of the magazine Reader's Digest.
 
The company's brands include Reader's Digest, Taste of Home, The Family Handyman, Simple & Delicious , Birds & Blooms, Reminisce, Country, EnrichU, and others. At its peak in 1973, the flagship magazine had over 30 million subscribers and continues to be published in 30 countries. As of 2016, its portfolio of brands garners 53 million unique online visitors and 40 million print readers per month.

History
 
Trusted Media Brands, Inc. (TMBI) was founded as Reader's Digest Association, Inc. (RDA) in New York City in 1922 by married duo DeWitt Wallace and Lila Bell Wallace. The two self-published the first edition of Reader's Digest in February 1922. To market the magazine, the two used direct mail marketing and sent 5,000 letters to nurses and schoolteachers. In 1925, DeWitt Wallace purchased land in Westchester County, New York where he moved the headquarters of RDA. In 1927, the number of Reader's Digest subscribers increased to 30,000. In 1939, that number was up to 3 million, and, by 1973, it had reached over 30 million.
 
In 1986, under the new leadership of George Grune, the RDA began creating and acquiring new brands and publications to diversify its portfolio. Its first special-interest magazine, Travel Holiday, was acquired in 1986 and was followed by the acquisition of The Family Handyman in 1987. In 1990, it acquired American Health. That same year, the company went public. At the time, it had 7,200 employees in 54 locations throughout the world.

In 1991, RDA acquired Joshua Morris Publishing, a children's book publisher and made its first move into the children's book industry.
 
In 2002, RDA purchased Reiman Publications and its selection of 12 magazines for $760 million. The deal gave RDA ownership over magazines including Taste of Home, Country Woman, Birds & Blooms, Country, Reminisce, Healthy Cooking, Simple & Delicious, Farm & Ranch Living, and others. In 2005, RDA launched Every Day with Rachael Ray and purchased Allrecipes.com the following year. Both would eventually be sold to the Meredith Corporation in 2011 and 2012 respectively.
 
In March 2007, RDA was purchased by an investment group led by private equity firm, Ripplewood Holdings, for $1.6 billion. Ripplewood made RDA a private company for the first time since 1990. RDA filed for bankruptcy in 2009 and again in 2012. It emerged from bankruptcy in 2013. On April 7, 2014, Bonnie Kintzer was appointed President and CEO of RDA. Kintzer had previously worked at RDA from 1998 to 2007.
 
One of Kintzer's first major moves was to change the company's name to Trusted Media Brands, Inc. (TMBI) in September 2015. The new name was chosen to encompass all brands under the company's banner rather than just Reader's Digest. TMBI has placed renewed focus on a wide variety of media platforms including digital content, social media, video, and others. As of 2016, TMBI's portfolio of brands reaches 53 million unique visitors, 40 million print readers, and 40 million social media users per month. In 2016, TMBI sold its children's publishing operations to Readerlink Distribution Services.

In August 2021, TMBI acquired Jukin Media.

Brands and publications

Trusted Media Brands is home to several media brands across multiple digital platforms, social media, magazines, books, music, and events.

Taste of Home

 
Taste of Home is a digital content provider (TasteofHome.com) and print magazine that offers information on food, cooking, and entertainment. Each year, the brand publishes 3,000 recipes, tips and stories from home cooks, all of which are tested and prepared in the Taste of Home Test Kitchen in Milwaukee, Wisconsin. Taste of Home also produced original web series called Fun with Food! and America the Tasty.

Reader's Digest

 
Reader's Digest is a digital content provider (RD.com) and print magazine that has been in publication since 1922. The brand offers a collection of true stories, advice, and humor. Content includes advice on health, nutrition, food, and home alongside stories of national and local interest. The magazine was, at one time, the largest consumer magazine in the United States. It currently produces digital content (RD.com) and continues to publish print magazines in locations throughout the world.

The Family Handyman

 
The Family Handyman is a brand with an emphasis on DIY home improvement and home repair. Digital (FamilyHandyman.com) and print content provide advice and how-to guides from current and former experts and professionals.

Birds and Blooms

 
Birds & Blooms is a bird and gardening magazine that is the largest such magazine in North America. It offers tips on gardening, DIY crafts, and information on birds and other backyard animals.

Other brands
 
Other brands include Country, Country Woman, Simple & Delicious, Reminisce, Prevention, Farm & Ranch Living, EnrichU, LifeRich Publishing and Haven Home.

Business divisions
 
North America
 Reader's Digest, RD.com, magazine, books;
 Taste of Home, TasteofHome.com, magazine, books;
 The Family Handyman, Birds & Blooms, Country, Farm & Ranch Living, Haven Home, Reminisce;
 EnrichU, Taste Digital Community
 Jukin Media
 
International
(Operations and licenses in 30+ countries)
 
 RD Europe, Africa and Middle East
 RD Asia Pacific
 RD Canada
 RD Latin America regions

See also

 List of New York companies
 List of English-language book publishing companies

References

External links
Official website
 

 
American companies established in 1922
Book publishing companies based in New York (state)
Companies based in Manhattan
Companies based in White Plains, New York
Magazine publishing companies of the United States
Mass media companies based in New York City
Mount Pleasant, New York
Publishing companies established in 1922
Reader's Digest
2007 mergers and acquisitions
Companies that filed for Chapter 11 bankruptcy in 2009
Companies that filed for Chapter 11 bankruptcy in 2012